Azura was the daughter of Adam and Eve and the wife (and sister) of Seth in the Book of Jubilees, chapter 4.

See also
List of names for the biblical nameless#Cain and Abel's sisters

References

Children of Adam and Eve
Seth
Book of Jubilees
Women in the Old Testament apocrypha